Waikiki Parc is a boutique hotel located in Honolulu, Hawaii. The hotel contains 297 studio units. The hotel features a rooftop heated swimming pool and fitness room and is the luxury sister property of Halekulani located just across the street on Waikiki Beach.

References

External links 
 

Hotels in Honolulu
Waikiki